The Baraka School was a small education program that took at-risk 12-year-old boys from the Baltimore public school system to the Kenyan outback for two years to live and study. The school was located in Laikipia District and the program began in 1996 with funding from the Abell Foundation, a local Baltimore philanthropy. 

The program was shut down in 2003 because of security threats. After the 2002 hotel bombing in Mombasa and the 2003 invasion of Iraq, the school administrators decided not to re-open the school. 

The school program was featured in the 2005 documentary The Boys of Baraka. The campus has since been transformed into Daraja Academy.

See also

 Education in Kenya
 List of schools in Kenya

External links
Baltimore City Schools - Baraka Program
Baltimore City Paper: The Baraka School Gets Back on Its Feet
Baltimore City Paper: A Kenyan School For At-Risk Baltimore Boys Holds Promise For Some, A Mere Respite From the Streets For Others
blackperspective.com - Blessing from the Dark Continent
Civic Bulletin 20 - Why School Vouchers Can Help Inner-City Children

1996 establishments in Kenya
Boarding schools in Kenya
Boys' schools in Kenya
Defunct schools in Kenya
Educational institutions established in 1996
Laikipia County